Mohun Bagan youth teams were the under-18, under-15 and under-13 football teams of Indian professional multi-sports club Mohun Bagan. The Under-18 team of the club was generally referred to as the primary youth team as it was the last stage of progression for promotion of youth players into the first team. The youth teams participated in the Calcutta Football League and the Elite league of various age groups. The team was set up with the leadership of the footballer Balai Das Chattopadhyay in 1944.

Academy history
Mohun Bagan collaborated with Steel Authority of India  (SAIL) to establish a residential academy for youth development in 2002. On 20 July 2002 Mohun Bagan SAIL Football Academy was set up in Durgapur, and the primary objective of the academy was "Spot and Groom the Youth", with the best of training using modern techniques, tactics, physical and psychological conditioning, and related inputs, so that in near future, India could see them in the national platform. 

In 2007 the club had appointed a famous Brazilian football expert  Luiz Greco, as the Technical Director of the youth teams of Mohun Bagan SAIL Football Academy. 

The academy teams won various trophies across the country. The academy's greatest feat was achieved in 2006 when the club's U14 team qualified for the Final Round of Nike Premier Cup (Under-14), a worldwide club tournament hosted by Manchester United, by beating East Bengal in the National Qualifier and Singapore Sports School in the final of South-East Asia Qualifier. Till then no Indian team had ever participated at the premier level since independence. The team faced some of the top clubs like Manchester United, São Paulo, Athletic Bilbao and Ferencvárosi in the group stage and, Brussels and Universidad Católica in the 17-20th place play-offs semi-finals and 19th place play-off final respectively. Unfortunately the team didn't win any match and ranked 20th in the tournament among the 20 qualified teams over the world. 

From 2015 to 2018 the U19 team had participated in the prestigious IFA Shield, which was organised as an U19 tournament due to the busy schedules of the clubs' senior teams. Mohun Bagan was the runners-up for two consecutive seasons, 2017 and 2018.  

In 2017 the U15 team had defeated ATK by a record 13–0 scoreline in the opening match of AIFF U15 Youth League.  

In 2019 the U19 team also participated in a regional franchise-based Talent Hunt league called Zee Bangla Football League that featured the top 4 clubs of West Bengal (Mohun Bagan, East Bengal, Mohammedan and Aryan) along with 16 franchise teams representing various districts of the state. The organisers declared both Mohun Bagan and East Bengal as the winners after the final match was abandoned due to fan unrest. 

On 16 January 2020, ATK owners Kolkata Games and Sports bought 80% stake in Mohun Bagan's football division. As part of the purchase, it was announced that the consortium would merge its brand with Mohun Bagan to create a merged entity for the 2020–21 season onwards. After the postponement due to COVID-19 pandemic, the new name for the team was officially unveiled on 10 July 2020 as ATK Mohun Bagan FC. It was also revealed that the club would retain the main colours of Mohun Bagan, along with its iconic insignia. Mohun Bagan's existing reserves and youth teams were abandoned and no new youth teams were created for two years due to the pandemic. In June 2022, number of trials for under-13, under-15 and under-18 football aspirants were conducted to set-up new youth teams for ATK Mohun Bagan.

Honours
National Football League U-19 (1): 2004–05
South-East Asia Qualifiers for Manchester United Premier Cup: 2006

References

Further reading
 Mohun Bagan AC
 ATK Mohun Bagan FC
Mohun Bagan AC
2002 establishments in West Bengal